Milan Rakić (born 9 February 1981) is former a Slovenian international footballer.

Club career
Born in Novi Sad, SR Serbia, he begin his career in 1998 in the Serbian club RFK Novi Sad. In 2001, he moves to Slovenia where, after playing two seasons for NK Aluminij Kidričevo, signs for one of the most successful clubs, NK Maribor. He also played for another Slovenian club FC Koper and for the Montenegrin First League club FK Mogren before, in summer 2009, he moved to Hungary to play with Kecskeméti TE until January 2010 when he returned to Serbia and signed with SuperLiga side FK Smederevo. Since summer 2010 he has returned to FK Novi Sad playing then in the Serbian First League.

International career
In 2005, he made his only appearance for the Slovenia national football team.

Honours
Maribor
Slovenian Football Cup: 2003–04
Mogren
Montenegrin First League: 2008–09

References

1981 births
Living people
Footballers from Novi Sad
Slovenian footballers
Association football midfielders
Slovenian expatriate footballers
RFK Novi Sad 1921 players
NK Aluminij players
NK Maribor players
Slovenian PrvaLiga players
FC Koper players
FK Mogren players
Slovenian expatriate sportspeople in Montenegro
Expatriate footballers in Montenegro
Kecskeméti TE players
Slovenian expatriate sportspeople in Hungary
Expatriate footballers in Hungary
FK Smederevo players
Serbian SuperLiga players
Montenegrin First League players
Slovenia international footballers